was a Japanese jazz composer and pianist.

Maeda learned piano as a young child, and moved to Tokyo to play and arrange jazz professionally in 1955. There he played with Shungo Sawada's ensemble and founded a group called the Wind Breakers. He joined the West Liners, led by Konosuke Saijo, as a pianist and arranger in 1959. Known as a composer, he penned pieces for The Blue Coats, Tatsuya Takahashi, Nobuo Hara, and Toshiyuki Miyama.

References
Yozo Iwanami and Kazunori Sugiyama, "Norio Maeda". The New Grove Dictionary of Jazz. 2nd edn, ed. Barry Kernfeld.

1934 births
2018 deaths
Japanese jazz composers
Japanese jazz pianists
Japanese male pianists
Male jazz composers
Male jazz pianists
Musicians from Osaka Prefecture